Xander Skinner (born 18 March 1998) is a Namibian swimmer. He competed in the men's 100 metre freestyle event at the 2017 World Aquatics Championships.  He is a graduate of SPIRE Institute and Academy, an Olympic training center in Geneva, Ohio.

At the 2022 South Africa National Swimming Championships, Skinner won the bronze medal in the 100 metre freestyle with a Namibian record time of 50.43 seconds.

Major results

Individual

Long course

Short course

Relay

Long course

References

External links
 McKendree Bearcats bio
 2019 African Games bio

1998 births
Living people
Namibian male freestyle swimmers
Place of birth missing (living people)
Swimmers at the 2019 African Games
African Games competitors for Namibia
McKendree Bearcats
Namibian expatriate sportspeople in the United States
Swimmers at the 2022 Commonwealth Games
Commonwealth Games competitors for Namibia